Axel Tuanzebe (born 14 November 1997) is an English professional footballer who plays as a defender for EFL Championship club Stoke City, on loan from Premier League club Manchester United.

Tuanzebe is a graduate of the Manchester United youth system and won both the Jimmy Murphy Young Player of the Year and Denzil Haroun Reserve Team Player of the Year awards. He made his competitive debut in an FA Cup game against Wigan Athletic in January 2017. He has had three spells on loan at Aston Villa and helped them to win promotion to the Premier League in 2019.

Born in the Democratic Republic of the Congo, he relocated to England at a young age and has represented England at under-19, under-20 and under-21 levels.

Club career

Manchester United

Early years
Tuanzebe was associated with the Manchester United academy from the age of eight. He was captain of the Milk Cup winning youth side in 2014. In May 2015, Tuanzebe won the Jimmy Murphy Young Player of the Year award. Academy coach Paul McGuinness noted that Tuanzebe was likely the first first-year scholar to captain the under-18 side since Gary Neville.

On 31 October 2015, at the age of 17, Tuanzebe was named on the substitutes bench for a match against Crystal Palace in the Premier League, the first time he had been a member of a first-team matchday squad.

2016–17 season
On 29 January 2017, Tuanzebe made his Manchester United debut as a 68th-minute substitute, replacing Timothy Fosu-Mensah during a 4–0 FA Cup victory over Wigan Athletic at Old Trafford. Four days later, he extended his contract at Manchester United until 2020, with the option of a further year. On 7 May 2017, Tuanzebe started a senior match for the first time, in a 2–0 defeat against Arsenal in the Premier League. He won the Denzil Haroun Reserve Team Player of the Year award in May 2017.

2017–18 season
Tuanzebe made his first start of the season against Swansea City in the EFL Cup on 24 October 2017, playing a key part in the second goal of the 2–0 victory. On 5 December 2017, he made his European debut in a 2–1 victory over CSKA Moscow in the UEFA Champions League.

Loans to Aston Villa
On 25 January 2018, Tuanzebe joined Championship side Aston Villa on loan for the remainder of the season. However, due to suffering an injury he was only able to make five appearances before returning to Manchester United. In August 2018, after going on United's pre-season tour to the United States, he joined Aston Villa on loan again for the 2018–19 season. On 27 May 2019, he played the full 90 minutes as Villa achieved promotion to the Premier League in the 2019 EFL Championship play-off final with a victory over Derby County in the final.

2019–20 season
In July 2019, Tuanzebe signed a new contract with Manchester United until June 2022, with an option for an additional year. He became the youngest player to captain United since Norman Whiteside in 1985, during an EFL Cup victory against Rochdale in September 2019.

2020–21 season
On 20 October 2020, Tuanzebe started his first UEFA Champions League match in a 2–1 away win against Paris Saint-Germain. He started his first league game of the season on 27 January 2021, in a 2–1 home defeat to eventual bottom-finishers Sheffield United.

2021–22 season: Aston Villa & Napoli loans
After a couple of displays for Manchester United in pre season friendlies, including a 4-2 away defeat at Queens Park Rangers, on 8 August 2021, Tuanzebe signed a new two-year contract with Manchester United, with the option of an extra year; that day, he also agreed to rejoin Aston Villa on loan for the 2021–22 season, his third loan spell with the club. On 8 January 2022, Tuanzebe was recalled from his Aston Villa loan, and loaned to Serie A team Napoli.

2022–23 season: Stoke City loan
On 31 January 2023, Tuanzebe joined Stoke City on loan for the remainder of the 2022–23 season.

International career
Tuanzebe is eligible to represent England or the Democratic Republic of the Congo at international level. He has played youth international football for England at under-19, under-20 and under-21 levels.

Tuanzebe began his international career in June 2016, when he made his first appearance for England at under-19 level, against Mexico. He was a member of the England under-20 squad which won all three matches at the Four Nations tournament in October 2016. Tuanzebe was withdrawn from selection for the 2017 FIFA U-20 World Cup due to club commitments.

On 10 November 2017, Tuanzebe made his debut for England at under-21 level, against Ukraine.

Style of play
Tuanzebe's preferred position is at centre-back, but he can also play as a right-back, and has featured as a holding midfielder. His playing style has been compared to that of teammate Eric Bailly and former Spain international Javi Martínez. Tuanzebe's performance on his first-team debut in a friendly against Wigan Athletic in July 2016 led manager José Mourinho to remark, "10 minutes is enough! The potential is there, you see it immediately."

Personal life
Tuanzebe was born in Bunia, in the Democratic Republic of the Congo. He relocated to England with his family at the age of four. He attended St Cuthbert's RC High School in Rochdale and captained the Year 7 football team to the final of the English National Schools Cup at Stamford Bridge in 2009. In the same year, he was awarded Sports Boy of the Year by the Mayor of Rochdale. He also represented his school in cross-country and triple-jump. He is the younger brother of ex-Clitheroe striker Dimitri Tuanzebe.

In July 2018, he broke the Guinness World Record for the fastest time to individually clear a game of Hungry Hungry Hippos, while in Los Angeles on Manchester United's pre-season tour.

Career statistics

Honours
Manchester United
UEFA Europa League: 2016–17; runner-up: 2020–21

Aston Villa
EFL Championship play-offs: 2019

Individual
Jimmy Murphy Young Player of the Year: 2014–15
Denzil Haroun Reserve Team Player of the Year: 2016–17

References

External links

Profile at the Manchester United F.C. website

1997 births
Living people
People from Ituri Province
Democratic Republic of the Congo footballers
English footballers
England youth international footballers
England under-21 international footballers
Association football defenders
Manchester United F.C. players
Aston Villa F.C. players
S.S.C. Napoli players
Stoke City F.C. players
Serie A players
Premier League players
English Football League players
Expatriate footballers in Italy
English sportspeople of Democratic Republic of the Congo descent
Democratic Republic of the Congo emigrants to England